The Great Teacher Onizuka anime television series is based on Tohru Fujisawa's manga series of the same name. Animated by Studio Pierrot and directed by Noriyuki Abe, the series ran for forty-three episodes and was broadcast on Fuji Television from June 30 1999, to September 24, 2000. During the original run, episodes were identified as "lessons" and did not have titles. The episode titles in the list below are from the English Tokyopop release.

The anime series uses five pieces of theme music: two openings and three endings. The first opening theme, "Driver's High" by L'Arc-en-Ciel is used from episodes 1 to 17. The second opening theme, "Hitori no Yoru" by Porno Graffitti is used from episodes 18 to 43. The first ending theme, "Last Piece" by Kirari is used from episodes 1 to 17. The first opening theme, "Driver's High" is used as the ending theme in episode 43 and an insert song in episode 17.

Episode list

References

External links
 Studio Pierrot website 

English
Great Teacher Onizuka